Albert Lemieux (1916-2003) was a politician and business person in Quebec, Canada.

Background

He was born on April 23, 1916, in Saint-Stanislas-de-Kostka, Quebec and was an attorney.

Political career

Lemieux ran as a Bloc Populaire Canadien candidate in the provincial district of Beauharnois in the 1944 election and won against Union Nationale incumbent Delpha Sauvé. He did not run for re-election in the 1948 election.

Retirement

He was appointed judge in 1966 and served in that capacity until 1970. He died on August 12, 2003.

Footnotes

1916 births
2003 deaths
Bloc populaire MNAs